Johanna Acs (born 1992) is a German model and beauty pageant titleholder who won Miss Universe Germany 2016 and represented Germany at the Miss Universe 2016.

Personal life
Johanna works as a model in Germany and is studying Textile and Clothing Management. She wants to start with a Master in Textile Trade and Technology. In her free time she loves to travel, see new cultures, learn languages and explore the world.  She also likes to work out at the gym and to swim to keep her body healthy and fit.

Pageantry

Miss International 2010
Johanna represented Germany at Miss International 2010 in China on November 7, 2010, where she placed Top 15.

Miss Supertalent 2014
Johanna represented Germany at Miss Supertalent 2014 in Seoul, South Korea on May 30, 2014,  where she placed Top 7.

Miss Grand International 2014
Johanna represented Germany at Miss Grand International 2014 in Bangkok, Thailand on October 7, 2014, but Unplaced at the pageant.

Miss Universe Germany 2016
Johanna was crowned Miss Universe Germany 2016 on August 7, 2016, by Sarah-Lorraine Riek and competed at Miss Universe 2016 pageant.

Miss Universe 2016
Johanna represented Germany at Miss Universe 2016 but Unplaced.

References

External links
Official Miss Universe Germany website
Johanna Acs is Miss Universe Germany 2016

1992 births
Living people
Miss Universe 2016 contestants
Miss International 2010 delegates
German beauty pageant winners
People from Eschweiler
German female models